79 Cancri is a star in the constellation Cancer, located 400 light years from the Sun. It is just visible to the naked eye as a dim, yellow-hued star with an apparent visual magnitude of 6.04. This object is gradually moving slower to the Earth with a heliocentric radial velocity of −3.2 km/s.

This is an aging giant star with a stellar classification of G5 III, which indicates that, at the age of 770 million years, it has exhausted the hydrogen at its core and evolved away from the main sequence. The star has 2.30 times the mass of the Sun and has expanded to 9.4 times the Sun's radius. It is radiating 58 times the Sun's luminosity from its enlarged photosphere at an effective temperature of 5,076 K.

References

G-type giants
Cancer (constellation)
Durchmusterung objects
Cancri, 79
078715
045033
3640